Claude Guyot (born 16 January 1947, in Savigny-sur-Orge) is a French retired cyclist. His sporting career began with U.S. Creteil.

Guyot made his debut in 1965, finishing in second place in the one-day race Paris-Troyes. Then he participated three times in the Tour de l'Avenir, where in 1967 he won two stages and finished eleventh overall. The same year he won a silver medal in the amateur road race at the 1967 UCI Road World Championships.

In 1968 he turned professional and won one-day races in Auxerre, Saint-Raphael and Tréguier. Next year he won a one-day race in Pleneut, only to retire from cycling in 1970.

His cousin Fernand Etter and brothers, Bernard Guyot, Jr. and Serge Guyot, are also former competitive cyclists.

References

1947 births
Living people
French male cyclists
People from Savigny-sur-Orge
Sportspeople from Essonne
Cyclists from Île-de-France
20th-century French people